Franco Rizzi (born 13 July 1964) is a Venezuelan footballer. He played in four matches for the Venezuela national football team from 1987 to 1989. He was also part of Venezuela's squad for the 1983 Copa América tournament.

References

1964 births
Living people
Venezuelan footballers
Venezuela international footballers
Place of birth missing (living people)
Association football midfielders